"Sunny Jim" is the name of two completely unconnected characters used in advertising and product branding:
(1) a cartoon character created to promote Force cereal, the first commercially successful wheat flake;
(2) the name of a brand of peanut butter produced in the Seattle area. It also has been used as a form of address for men in general or to refer to those named James.

Sunny Jim and Force cereal
The character on boxes of Force cereal was created in the United States in 1902 by writer Minnie Maud Hanff and artist Dorothy Ficken (the mother of Fred Gwynne),  initially for an advertising campaign. Rather than selling the benefits of eating wheat, which Hanff assumed customers already knew, her copy for the original advertisements told stories in verse, such as this one:

Jim Dumps was a most unfriendly man,
Who lived his life on the hermit plan;
In his gloomy way he'd gone through life,
And made the most of woe and strife;
Till Force one day was served to him
Since then they've called him "Sunny Jim."

The advertisements featured slogans such as "Better than  a Vacation" and "A Different Food for Indifferent Appetites." Other verses included:

Whatever you say, wherever you've been,
You can't beat the cereal, that raised Sunny Jim!

and

High o'er the fence leaps Sunny Jim,
Force is the food that raises him

This last rhyme became a familiar catchphrase.

Also used was the slogan "When skies are grey and times are grim, wake up and smile with Sunny Jim", which appeared on advertising coins.

The campaign was wildly successful at promoting the character of Sunny Jim. Printer's Ink stated September 17, 1902 that "No current novel or play is so universally popular. He is as well-known as President Roosevelt or J. Pierpont Morgan." However, the cereal company turned its advertising account over to a different firm, which did not approve of humor in advertising and more or less abandoned the campaign.

In the United States, Force followed a convoluted path involving many corporate mergers. The last owner stopped producing the cereal in 1983. Both the cereal and Sunny Jim had greater success in the United Kingdom, where Force cereal was available until 2013, and the box still featured a picture of Sunny Jim.

Sunny Jim Peanut Butter
The brand of peanut butter known as Sunny Jim was manufactured in Seattle, Washington, by the Pacific Standard Foods company. The company was founded by Germanus Wilhelm Firnstahl in 1921 after he moved to Seattle from Wisconsin and bought a peanut roaster. Firnstahl based the apple-cheeked character seen on the jars on his son, Lowell, after taking photos of all his children and selecting the best photograph as model (allegedly because Lowell was the only child with all his teeth at the time). During the 1950s the brand accounted for nearly a third of all peanut butter sold in the Seattle area. The company was sold in 1979 for $3 million to the Bristol Bay Native Corp. A large sign on the factory building made the "Sunny Jim building" on Airport Way South a familiar landmark to motorists passing on nearby Interstate 5 which Firnstahl had purchased during the Great Depression. In 1997, there was a fire at this plant (by then owned by the city of Seattle) which destroyed the sign and a portion of the building. On September 20, 2010, a massive fire finished off the Sunny Jim plant as well as a vacant building on the factory site. The main advertisement for Sunny Jim was "Sunny Jim has underground peanuts with a flavor that's outta sight".

General usage
From shortly after the time of its use in advertising, the term gained general currency for cheerful man, and was particularly applied as a nickname to individuals named James, such as UK Prime Minister James Callaghan.  Often with the spelling 'Sonny Jim' it was used as familiar term of address in Britain, Australia and New Zealand.

Nicknames
James Rolph (1869–1934), American politician.
Sunny Jim Fitzsimmons (1874–1966) was a famous thoroughbred horse trainer
James Mackay (1880–1953), Australian cricketer
James Young of Celtic FC (1882–1922)
Jim Bottomley (1900–1959), American baseball player.
James Callaghan, Prime Minister of the United Kingdom from 1976 to 1979
General Alexander A. Vandegrift, 18th Commandant of the Marine Corps, a nickname given to him by his mentor Smedley J. Butler

Other uses
At the La Jolla Cove beach in San Diego, California, there is a sea cave called "Sunny Jim Cave". When the cave is viewed from a certain angle, the opening of the cave bears a striking similarity to the cartoon character. The cave is accessible by swimming from the cove, but also is accessible from a nearby store that charges a nominal fee to walk down some in-store steps leading to the cave.
In The Elephant Man and the 2017 series Twin Peaks, both by David Lynch, there are characters nicknamed Sunny Jim.
In the 1968 film Coogan's Bluff, Walt (Played by Clint Eastwood) observes a picture of James Ringerman, the fugitive he is in pursuit of. The picture is signed "With Love, from Sunny Jim".
The Sunny Jim wheat flakes character is referenced in the lyrics to the song 1000 Umbrellas by XTC on the Skylarking album.
In Lobo (web series) based on the DC Comics character of the same name had a villain named Sunny Jim. He was voiced by Dee Bradley Baker and later by Tom Kenny.
Sonny Crockett of Miami Vice has a legal first name of James, and is frequently and even officially referred to as "Sonny James Crockett".

See also
Force (cereal)
List of breakfast cereal advertising characters

References

External links
Seattle Times stories about Sunny Jim peanut butter (registration required):
Fire Destroys I-5 Landmark -- Warehouse That Housed Sunny Jim (Peanut Butter) Plant Burns
Celeste F. Rogge, Who Inherited The Sunny Jim (Peanut Butter) Fortune, Dies At 84
 "The Case for Sunny Jim: An Advertising Legend Revisited" by Eileen Margerum in Sextant, the journal of Salem State College (cereal)

Comics characters introduced in 1902
Cereal advertising characters
Male characters in advertising